The San Agustin de Laredo Historic District is a historical district that covers what was once the original city of Laredo, Texas that was established by Don Tomás Sánchez. Today, the district is located in Downtown Laredo. The San Agustin District is home to San Agustin Cathedral (which the district's named after) and to the Republic of the Rio Grande Capitol. Most of the district's streets are made from bricks. Most of the buildings in the district reflect Spanish and Mexican influences and are made from masonry. The district is considered the last example of Spanish Colonization of the Lower Rio Grande Valley. The San Agustin de Laredo Historic District is registered in the National Register of Historic Places since 1973. Its historic significance is Architecture and Engineering. Its architectural style is Mission, Spanish Revival, and Greek Revival.

Gallery of San Agustin Historic District

See also

National Register of Historic Places listings in Webb County, Texas

References

External links

Neighborhoods in Laredo, Texas
History of Laredo, Texas
Historic districts on the National Register of Historic Places in Texas
National Register of Historic Places in Webb County, Texas